Wan'an is a town under the administration of Xiuning County, Anhui, China. , it has 11 villages under its administration.

References 

Township-level divisions of Anhui
Xiuning County